Smoliari is the soundtrack from the 1978 television film of the same name, directed by Dušan Kodaj. The compilation released as the first original picture soundtrack in the country of origin was issued in 1979 on OPUS Records, with featuring songs written by Ali Brezovský and Kamil Peteraj. Among artists who contributed to the project were Marika Gombitová and Miro Žbirka.

Track listing

Official releases
 1979: Smoliari, LP, MC, OPUS, #9116 0743
 1995: Smoliari a iné, CD, re-release (bonus tracks), Open Music #0038 2311

Credits and personnel

 Ali Brezovský - music, conductor
 Kamil Peteraj - lyrics
 Miroslav Žbirka - lead vocal
 Július Mikeš - lead vocal
 Milan Markovič - lead vocal
 Marika Gombitová - lead vocal
 Zora Kolínska - lead vocal
 Magda Medveďová - lead vocal 
 Peter Hečko - lead vocal

 V.V. Systém - performer
 Bezinky - chorus
 Taktici - chorus
 Milan Vašica - producer
 Vladimír Valovič - music director
 Peter Hubka - sound director
 Ľuboš Klásek - technical coordinator
 Ján Meisner - cover

Awards
Ali Brezovský received for the composed music an award in 1978.

Smoliari a iné

A re-issue of the album, enhanced with bonus tracks was entitled Smoliari  iné, was released on Open Music in 1995.

Track listing

Additional credits and personnel
 Vlado Kolenič - lead vocal
 Mirka Brezovská - lead vocal
 Karol Duchoň - lead vocal

References

General

Specific

1979 soundtrack albums
Film soundtracks
Soundtracks by Slovak artists